Fairy Tales is a book of short stories by E. E. Cummings,  published posthumously in 1965.  It contains four stories:  "The Old Man Who Said 'Why'", "The Elephant and the Butterfly", "The House That Ate Mosquito Pie", and "The Little Girl Named I".  The book is printed in full color with illustrations by John Eaton.

1965 short story collections
Works by E. E. Cummings
Books published posthumously
American short story collections
Fantasy short story collections